Romain Poté (1 December 1935 – 6 May 2010) was a Belgian sprinter. He competed in the men's 100 metres at the 1960 Summer Olympics.

References

1935 births
2010 deaths
Athletes (track and field) at the 1960 Summer Olympics
Belgian male sprinters
Belgian male long jumpers
Olympic athletes of Belgium
Universiade medalists in athletics (track and field)
Place of birth missing
Universiade bronze medalists for Belgium
Medalists at the 1959 Summer Universiade